Hot & Soul is the third studio album by French-Belgian singer Viktor Lazlo. A French version of the album was recorded and released in France, entitled Club Desert.

The first single off the album, City Never Sleeps, was written by Rob Davis who would later go on to write the worldwide hit Can't Get You Out of My Head for Kylie Minogue. The single charted on the Dutch single charts.

Other singles to be released off the album were In The Midnight Sky, Amour Puissance Six and the song Baisers, which was only included on the French version of the album.

Track listing

Charts

Album

Single releases

References

1989 albums
Viktor Lazlo albums
Polydor Records albums